Singer Motors Limited was a British motor vehicle manufacturing business, originally a bicycle manufacturer founded as Singer & Co by George Singer, in 1874 in Coventry, England. Singer & Co's bicycle manufacture continued. From 1901 George Singer's Singer Motor Co made cars and commercial vehicles.

Singer Motor Co was the first motor manufacturer to make a small economy car that was a replica of a large car, showing a small car was a practical proposition. It was much more sturdily built than otherwise similar cyclecars. With its four-cylinder ten horsepower engine the Singer Ten was launched at the 1912 Cycle and Motor Cycle Show at Olympia. William Rootes, a Singer apprentice at the time of its development and consummate car-salesman, contracted to buy 50, the entire first year's supply. It became a best-seller. Ultimately, Singer's business was acquired by his Rootes Group in 1956, which continued the brand until 1970, a few years following Rootes' acquisition by the American Chrysler corporation.

History

Bicycles
George Singer began his bicycle-making business in Coventry in 1874.
At the time, he was foreman  of the Coventry Sewing Machine Company, from which he resigned. He was joined in the business by J. E. Stringer, his brother-in-law. It appears Singer was inspired to produce a bicycle safer than the Ordinary (penny-farthing) type standard at the time, by cyclist George Dominy. Singer did not alter the large front and small rear wheel design of the Ordinary, but by raking the front forks (a first) did make it safer. He patented the design on 24 October 1878.

He followed this with an 1879 model having a large rear wheel and small front wheels which could be folded aside. and in 1885 with a tricycle, rear wheels driven by chain, which also featured a handbrake (designed by Singer and his associate, R. H. Lea) on the rear axle.

In about 1888, Singer introduced the Rational, a diamond-framed model with wheels the same size, each about  diameter. It also offered removable handlebars and removable rear wheel.  While safer, its performance suffered. Nevertheless, it proved popular with cycle tourers.

In 1895, Singer Cycle faced a £600,000 "floatation by that egregious company promoter" Terah Hooley, but survived. It also weathered an industry slump in 1898 that wiped out many British bicycle makers.

Singer Cycle Company began producing motor cars in 1901.

Engines, three-wheelers and motorcycles

Singer Cycle began motor vehicle production in 1901, purchasing the manufacturing rights to the Perks & Birch Motor Wheel, a one-cylinder engine contained in a spoked aluminium wheel, known as a motorwheel. It was a  four-stroke designed by former Beeston employees Edwin Perks and Frank Birch. A unique feature was that the engine, fuel tank, carburettor and low-tension magneto were all housed in a two-sided cast alloy spoked wheel. It was probably the first motor bicycle to be provided with magneto ignition.  It was perhaps the only motorcycle engine of its era with reliable ignition. These were fitted to bicycles. The design was used by Singer & Co in the rear wheel and then the front wheel of a trike.

In 1904, he developed a range of more conventional motorcycles which included 346 cc two strokes and, from 1911, side-valve models of 299 cc and 535 cc. In 1913 Singer & Co offered an open-frame ladies model.

Singer & Co stopped building motorcycles at the outbreak of the First World War.

Motorcycle racing
In 1909, Singer & Co built a series of racers and roadsters and entered several bikes in races, including the Isle of Man Senior TT in 1914.

Motor cars

Singer's first tricar was the Tri-Voiturette. It was powered by a  engine, and offered in two models, the No. 1 (passenger facing backward) and Mo. 2 (passenger facing forward); both fitted the passenger seat well behind the rear axle.

At the 1902 Cordingly Show, at the Islington Agricultural Hall, Singer showed two commercial variants of the Tri-Voiturette, the Motor Carrier, one for tradesmen, one for dairymen.

The Tri-Voiturette was replaced by another tricar, which had two front wheels and a driven rear, more horsepower, and a coachbuilt body, but with the passenger now in front of the driver.

Muriel Hind drove a Singer Tricar in the 1906 Land's End to John O'Groats Trial, with aviation pioneer Hilda Hewlett as her passenger and mechanic. She also drove a tricar in the twenty four hour London to Edinburgh Trial, again with a female passenger, making good time in torrential rain.

The first Singer-designed car was the 4-cylinder 2.4-litre 12/14 of 1906. The engine was bought in from Aster.

Singer made their first four-wheel car in 1905. It was designed by Scottish engineer Alexander Craig and was a variant of a design he had done for Lea-Francis having a 2-cylinder  engine.

The Craig engine was replaced in 1906 by White & Poppe engines in Singer's two light car models. These were a  twin and a 12/14 four-cylinder. These were joined by a White & Poppe-engined Doctor's Brougham and two Auster-powered tourers, a 12/14 and a 20/22.

For 1907, the Lea-Francis design was dropped and a range of two-, three- and four-cylinder models was launched, using White and Poppe engines. The Aster engined models were dropped in 1909 and a new range of larger cars introduced. All cars were now White and Poppe powered.

Singer experimented with a cyclecar, powered by a transversely-mounted aircooled engine in 1911–12. Instead,  the company built a light car, the Ten, which debuted in 1912 with a   four-cylinder engine; its main drawback was a three-speed transmission built into the rear axle. The Ten was the company's first big seller. The same year, two years after George Singer's death, the "bicycle wheel" radiator emblem was deleted.  That year's primary product was a 16/20, powered by a White & Poppe engine.

The use of their own power plants spread through the range until by the outbreak of the First World War all models except the low-volume 3.3-litre 20 hp were so equipped.

The Ten's performance attracted interest from former racing cyclist Lionel Martin, who bought a copy right off Singer's stand at the 1912 Olympia Motor Show. Martin set up shop in Henniker Mews, Kensington, England, tuning the four-cylinder cars, and did a robust business. This was aided by the motor racing success of Martin's own improved Ten, in particular at the Aston Clinton hillclimb. The Ten would also be sold by William Rootes, former Singer apprentice turned dealer.

On 11 July 1914, Beatrice Blore drove a Singer Ten car up the cable track (with a gradient of 1 in 3 in places) of the Great Orme, in Llandudno, North Wales, becoming the first woman to drive up the steep and challenging headland. She was six months pregnant at the time and the drive was a publicity stunt developed by her partner George Wilkin Browne to help sell the cars at his Llandudno garage, North Wales Silver Motors. The cars were advertised for sale for £195.

Production was suspended for the First World War, then resumed afterward. Except for detail changes, the engine remained the same until the Ten ended production in 1923; the chassis was redesigned in 1921. The two-seater was priced at £395.

In 1921, Singer purchased motorcycle and cyclecar maker Coventry Premier, selling a four-wheeler of their design, powered by a  water-cooled V-twin, for £250, under that name until 1924. The engine was changed to a four-cylinder Singer in 1922, but the car ceased production in 1923.

This new 15 used a chassis very similar to the 10's, and had one interesting feature, a retractable luggage rack. In 1924, the 15 was offered with a Weymann fabric body. Sales of the 15 were "modest".

The 10's engine was converted to overhead valves in 1923 and monobloc, while the next year, the Ten also got a Waymann body option.

The new 10/26 replaced the older 10 in 1924. it offered a  engine and modernized styling.  It was offered in several models, from the £195 four-seat Popular to the £295 Saloon Limousine Del Luxe.

At the 1926 London Motor Show, the company debuted the Junior, powered by a  OHV . Priced from £148 10s as a four-seat tourer, it had only rear-wheel brakes to start. Meanwhile, the 10/26 became the -engined Senior, joined by the new Six, powered by a  inline six based on the 10/26's and four-wheel servo-assisted brakes from Clayton Dewandre. The same year, Singer took over Calcott Brothers.

In the 1920s, Singer sales climbed steadily,  By 1928, Singer was Britain's third largest car maker after Austin and Morris.  Singer, restricted by a built-in site, acquired other companies for factory space. In 1926, they made 9,000 cars. In 1929, with seven factories and 8,000 employees, they produced 28,000 cars, though having just 15% they trailed far behind Austin and Morris which shared 60% of the market. Hampered by their new acquisitions, the cost of new machinery and a moving assembly line in their latest acquisition, Singer's offerings were eclipsed by new models from Austin, Morris, and Hillman; from 1932, these were joined by the new Ford Model Y.

And, like the Junior and Six, the track was increased. One other model was a fabric-bodied convertible saloon, the Sun.

The redesign left Singer with a few hundred older chassis, which the company bodied and sold as Deliverys, at £180.

Toward the end of the year, a privateer ran a two-seat Junior up Porlock Hill one hundred times in fifteen hours, which moved Singer to rename that model the Porlock.

In 1929, a 2+2 on the Junior chassis appeared, and the Senior disappeared, while the Six gained a  sidevalve. This was joined by a Super Six, with a  OHV and four-speed manual transmission. This was, said The Autocar, "the most impressive Singer yet"

The   Junior of 1931, with styling resembling the top-priced saloon and a "waterfall" grille, which lent the car its common name. At the top of the price range was the £480 Charles Frederick ‘C F’ Beauvais-designed Kaye Don saloon, built on the Silent-Six  platform. Hydraulic brakes were standard, except for the Kaye Don, which relied on servo-boosted Dewandre brakes. A sliding sunshine roof was also available.

In 1932, Leo J. Shorter became chief engineer (by 1940, technical director). He and two other designers created the new Sports Nine Sports, which made its debut at the London Motor Show that same year; it featured a two-bearing crankshaft engine of 972cc, which gave the car its name. Owing to manufacturing difficulties of the new bodywork, the "9" engine was fitted to a number of Junior chassis' as a stopgap until the production cars were ready, which gave rise to the incredibly rare "Junior-Nine". The production numbers are unknown, and only 8 are known to have survived. And in 1933, The Nine was joined by a new  six-cylinder, a 1.5 Horsepower six-cylinder, and a 2-Liter six-cylinder, while the Junior was dropped and the new sidevalve-engined 12 displaced the Ten. The Sports Nine was "an immediate success" among trials racers, and Singer entered a specially-prepared version at Le Mans, which led to the Nine being commonly called the Le Mans. Singer earned an "excellent reputation" in racing before three works Nines appeared at the 1935 Ulster Tourist Trophy, where all three wrecked, all from the same cause (steering failure) and all, incredibly, at the same spot. All the drivers literally walked away unscathed, but Singer's reputation in racing was beyond repair

Independent front suspension was added to the Nine in 1935, while the larger models got Fluidrive transmissions. The new  Eleven and two litre Sixteen debuted that year as well, both also with IFS, while the Eleven was also offered with "aerodynamic" Airstream coachwork; the name was given independent of the Chrysler.

The Nine became the Bantam in 1935, which also debuted at the London Motor Show; it was a close copy of the Ford Model Y (a popular subject for copying), with two-bearing crankshafts and a  engine; this, and its high £127 pricetag, made it uncompetitive. It had a two-bearing crankshaft and was the first Singer with a synchromesh gearbox, albeit with only three forward gears.  Continuing decline in sales led to financial trouble, and Singer attempted to cut costs, such as by switching back to mechanical brakes on the Nine in 1939.

In May 1936, W. E. Bullock, who had been managing director from 1919 together with his son, general manager from 1931, resigned following criticism from the shareholders at their annual general meeting. No longer viable, Singer & Co Limited was dissolved in December 1936 and what had been its business was transferred to a new company, Singer Motors Limited.

Singer Motors Limited

From 1938 to 1955, Singer Motors Ltd supplied new OHC engines (a few 9HP, a 10HP and numerous 12 HPs plus 4-speed gearboxes) for fitment to HRG Engineering Company's sports cars at Tolworth, Surrey - these replaced the 1.5 litre Meadows engines fitted to earlier cars.

After the Second World War, the new Roadster and the Ten and Twelve saloons all returned to production with little change.  In 1948, Singer's first streamlined car appeared, the SM1500 (designed by Technical Director Shorter), which featured coil spring IFS. and a separate chassis, still using the SOHC 1500cc engin; It was, however, expensive, at £799, and hopes it would save the company proved in vain.

The SM1500 was given a traditional radiator grille and renamed the Hunter in 1954; the high-priced Hunter was equally in vain. (Though specified with an optional HRG-designed DOHC engine, this was likely never sold.) In the December 2011 edition of Automobile Magazine, a 1954 SM1500 was compared to an MG TD, finding the Singer the superior roadster.

Rootes Group
By 1955, the business was in financial difficulties and the Rootes Brothers bought it the following year. They had first handled Singer sales just before the First World War.  The Singer brand was absorbed into their Rootes Group which had been an enthusiastic exponent of badge engineering since the early 1930s. The next Singer car, the Gazelle, was a more up-market Hillman Minx. which retained the pre-war designed Singer OHV engine for the I and II versions until 1958, when the IIA was given the Minx pushrod engine. The Vogue, which ran alongside the Minx/Gazelle from 1961, was based on the Hillman Super Minx with differing front end styling and more luxurious trim.

After 1958, all Singer products were mere badge-engineered models.

By 1970, Rootes were again struggling financially. They had been acquired by the American Chrysler corporation, and founder (by then Sir William Rootes) had died in 1964. In April 1970, as part of a rationalisation process, the last Singer rolled off the assembly line, almost 100 years after George Singer built the first cycle. The last car to carry the Singer name was an upmarket version of the rear engined Hillman Imp called the Chamois. With the take over of Rootes by Chrysler begun in 1964 and completed in 1967, many of the brands were set to vanish and use of the Singer name ended in 1970. The site of the Singer factory in Coventry is now occupied by Singer Hall, a hall of residence for Coventry University.

Models
The main models produced were:
 e. & o.e.

World War I

——————————————————————————————————————————————
December 1936: Singer & Co Limited dissolved;business transferred to Singer Motors Limited
——————————————————————————————————————————————

World War II

——————————————————————————————————————————————
December 1955: Singer Motors joins Rootes Group
——————————————————————————————————————————————

See also
 Premier Motorcycles
 George E. Stanley
 List of car manufacturers of the United Kingdom

Notes

Sources

 Kevin Atkinson The Singer Story, Cars, Commercial Vehicles, Bicycles, Motorcycles; Veloce Publishing 
Wise, David Burgess. "Singer: A Car for Every Purse and Purpose" in Ward, Ian, Executive Editor. The World of Automobiles, Volume 18, pp. 2064-71.  London: Orbis, 1974.

External links

 Singer Owners' Club
 Singer Motor Club
 North American Singer Owners Club
 
 Automobilemag.com; Singer Motors
 Singer Senior 1927
 Singer Six 1929
 Singer Super Six 1931
 Youtube.com: "O'Toole and the blue Singer."

 
Defunct motor vehicle manufacturers of England
Defunct cycle manufacturers of England
Defunct motorcycle manufacturers of the United Kingdom
Coventry motor companies
Manufacturing companies based in Coventry
Vehicle manufacturing companies established in 1875
Vehicle manufacturing companies disestablished in 1970
1875 establishments in England
1970 disestablishments in England
Rootes Group
British companies disestablished in 1970
British companies established in 1875